Christopher Mark Grammer (born 1 October 1984) is an English former first-class cricketer.

Grammer was born at Brighton in October 1984. He was educated at Brighton College, before going up to Homerton College, Cambridge. While studying at Cambridge, he played first-class cricket for both Cambridge University and Cambridge UCCE in 2009, making three appearances for Cambridge UCCE against Yorkshire, Sussex and Essex, in addition to playing for Cambridge University against Oxford in The University Match at Fenner's. He scored 97 runs for Cambridge UCCE, with a high score of 64,

Notes and references

External links

1984 births
Living people
Sportspeople from Brighton
People educated at Brighton College
Alumni of Homerton College, Cambridge
English cricketers
Cambridge MCCU cricketers
Cambridge University cricketers